Samadhistha Purush (sasamādhistha purῡśa, Sanskrit: समाधिस्थ पुरुष ) refers to a person who stays in a state of calm equipoise. Such a person remains unaffected in all situations and receives all emotions with a sense of detachment. A samadhistha purush is considered a self-realised person. He remains in a meditative state voluntarily, and at all times. It's a state many spiritually inclined people aim for. The first step to achieving this state is to live mindfully.

Etymology 
Samadhistha Purush is made up of two words: Samadhistha and Purush. Purush in this context refers to the practitioner. Further, Samadhistha is a Sanskrit compound made up of two terms: samādhi (Sanskrit: समाधी) and stha (Sanskrit: स्थ). Samādhi is a meditative state of consciousness according to Hinduism, Jainism, Buddhism, Sikhism and yogic schools. Such trance-like state is achieved by intense meditation or dhyana. And, stha would mean ‘still’ or ‘inactive’. However, philosopher Kireet Joshi points out: He (Samadhistha purush) is sthita (still), but not inactive. He is equal–minded but not inactive. Therefore, a samādhishtha purῡśa would be a practitioner whose mind, thoughts and faculties are still and he inhabits a meditative state actively.

Who is a Samadhistha Purush 
A sasamādhistha purῡśa remains unchanged, unaltered, unaffected through happiness or sadness, praise or condemnation, bliss or sorrow, loneliness or companionship, highs or lows of life. Such a person navigates life mindfully with an equanimous outlook. He has control over his mental faculties of indriya enabling him to check his mind from auto-response and to free it from conditioning. A Samadhistha purush is always in a meditative trance, by will. It doesn’t mean that such a person is inactive or passive. In fact, a samadhistha person is self-realised person who is in touch with his true nature. He becomes the master of his faculties or indriya, rather than being a slave to them. He is immersed in the super-consciousness. Monk Om Swami mentions the qualities of sasamādhistha purῡśa as: the adept firmly established in his tranquil equipoise. In The Synthesis of Yoga, Sri Aurobindo, says a soul that has settled in samadhi (samadhistha) without distraction and can embrace all in the scope of its being without being bound by any or deluded or limited”.

Spiritual Significance 
Spiritual Significance In Hinduism, Jainism, Buddhism, Sikhism and yogic traditions, samadhistha is a highly recommended mental state. And everyone is encouraged to become a samadhistha purush or practitioner. The voluntary permanent meditative consciousness is achieved by intense practice of dhyana or meditation. The importance of being a Samadhistha purush could be deducted from the fact that such a person, his qualities, characteristics and mannerisms are discussed in the Bhagavad Gita, between Lord Krishna and Arjun. In the Bhagavad Gita, Chapter 2, shloka 54, Arjun asks Lord Krishna as to what are the characteristics of a Samadhistha Purush.

स्थितप्रज्ञस्य का भाषा समाधिस्थस्य केशव।

स्थितधीः किं प्रभाषेत किमासीत व्रजेत किम्।। 2.54।। 

Hindi translation: र्जुन बोले - हे केशव ! परमात्मामें स्थित स्थिर बुद्धिवाले मनुष्यके क्या लक्षण होते हैं? वह स्थिर बुद्धिवाला मनुष्य कैसे बोलताहै, कैसे बैठता है और कैसे चलता है?

English translation: Arjun said :O Keshav, what is the disposition of one who is situated in divine consciousness? How does an enlightened person

talk? How does he sit? How does he walk?

Qualities According to Bhagavad Gita 
In the Bhagavad Gita, Lord Krishna describes a samadhistha purush from shloka 55 through 72. He describes the practitioner as:

"O Parth, when one discards all selfish desires and cravings of the senses that torment the mind, and becomes satisfied in the realization of the self, such a person is said to be transcendentally situated. One whose mind remains undisturbed amidst misery, who does not crave for pleasure, and who is free from attachment, fear, and anger, is called a sage of steady wisdom. One who remains unattached under all conditions, and is neither delighted by good fortune nor dejected by tribulation, he is a sage with perfect knowledge. One who is able to withdraw the senses from their objects, just as a tortoise withdraws its limbs into its shell, is established in divine wisdom. Aspirants may restrain the senses from their objects of enjoyment, but the taste for the sense objects remains. However, even this taste ceases for those who realizes the Supreme. The senses are so strong and turbulent, O son of Kunti, that they can forcibly carry away the mind even of a person endowed with discrimination and practicing self-control..... That person, who gives up all material desires and lives free from a sense of greed, proprietorship, and egoism, attains perfect peace. O Parth, such is the state of an enlightened soul that having attained it, one is never again deluded. Being established in this consciousness even at the hour of death, one is liberated from the cycle of life and death and reaches the Supreme Abode of God."

Lord Rama, Samadhistha Purush 
Lord Rama, who is called purushottama, is considered samadhistha purush, according to Monk Om Swami. Lord Rama is always in a meditative conscious state. He is in touch with his true nature, and has command over his faculties.

References 

Spirituality
Buddhist philosophical concepts
Hindu philosophical concepts
Yoga concepts